Beirut City Hall, also known as the Municipality of Beirut, is a landmark building built in downtown Beirut, Lebanon in 1924, and has become an architectural landmark in the downtown area of Beirut Central District. It features a yellow limestone facade and combines various architectural styles. The building is located on the intersection of Foch Street and Rue Weygand in the city center. The building is in the Venetian and Arabesque architectural styles, a mix that expresses the regional identity of the area. The building was restored after the Lebanese Civil War and it currently houses the office of the Governor of Beirut and the municipal council. It is open to the public and for official registration of documents.

Youssef Aftimus won the design competition for Beirut's City Hall in 1923. He later served as the minister of public works in the 1926-1927 government led by Auguste Basha Adib.

Overview
The Municipality was built in 1924-25 by the Lebanese architect Youssef Aftimos. Damaged and abandoned during the Lebanese Civil War, it was restored by the year 2000.

Construction
Previously located in the Petit Serail on Martyrs’ Square, Beirut's Municipality building, constructed in 1925 on Weygand Street was the masterpiece of Youssef Aftimos. The building is characterized by oriental-style façades. Conforming to the Neo-Moorish revivalist school – Youssef Aftimos being its main protagonist in Lebanon – its architecture expressed a reaction against the westernization of the country as well as the need to establish a more local or regional identity. A text inscribed on the building's entrance reflects this feeling: “These are the traces that identify us: seek out henceforth our traces.”  Damaged and abandoned during the Civil War (1975-1990), the Municipality was restored by the year 2000.

History
Beirut's Municipality building, constructed in 1925, was the masterpiece of Youssef Aftimos. He began to work on it after his return to Lebanon from Chicago. Prior to the construction of the new building, the Municipality was located in the Petit Serail on Martyrs' Square. The project to build a new headquarters for the Municipality of Beirut, together with a small garden, a fountain and a clock tower dates back to 1880. At first, the building was planned on the northwest corner of Martyrs’ Square. An alternative location in today's Riad Al-Solh Square was also investigated, but the Weygand Street site was finally selected. The Municipality building is characterized by oriental-style façades. Conforming to the Neo-Moorish revivalist school – Youssef Aftimos being its main protagonist in Lebanon – its architecture expressed a reaction against the westernization of the country since the late 19th century, as well as the need to establish a more local or regional identity. A text inscribed on the building's entrance reflects this feeling: “These are the traces that identify us: seek out henceforth our traces.”  Damaged and abandoned during the Civil War (1975-1990), the Municipality was restored by the year 2000.

Timeline
1880s: Project to build a new headquarters for the Municipality of Beirut together with a small garden, a fountain and a clock tower dates to these years.

1925: Constructed of Beirut's Municipality building by Youssef Aftimos.

1975-1990: Municipality building was damaged and abandoned during the Civil War.

2000: Restoration of the Municipality building.

See also
 Youssef Aftimos
 Petit Serail
 Martyrs' Square
 Riad Al-Solh Square
 Weygand Street
 Neo-Moorish revivalist schoolof architecture

References 
 Davie, May (1997) The History and Evolution of Public Spaces in Beirut Central District, Solidere, Beirut.
 Saliba, Robert (2004) Beirut City Center Recovery: The Foch-Allenby and Etoile Conservation Area, Steidel, Göttingen.

References

Buildings and structures in Beirut
Tourist attractions in Beirut